Keano Vanrafelghem (born 2 August 2003) is a Belgian professional footballer who plays as a forward for Belgian National Division 1 side Patro Eisden.

Club career
Vanrafelghem began his career at the youth academy of Club Brugge. On 22 August 2020, he made his debut for Brugge's reserve side, Club NXT in the Belgian First Division B against RWDM47. He came on as an 85th-minute substitute as NXT lost 0–2.

On 31 January 2023, Vanrafelghem signed with Patro Eisden.

Career statistics

Club

References

External links
Profile at the Belgian First Division B website

2003 births
Living people
Belgian footballers
Belgium youth international footballers
Association football forwards
Club NXT players
K. Patro Eisden Maasmechelen players
Challenger Pro League players